Richard Bruce Wherrett AM (10 December 19407 December 2001) was an Australian stage director, whose career spanned 40 years. he is known for being the founding director of the Sydney Theatre Company in 1979.

Early life, education and family
Richard Wherrett was born on 10 December 1940, the younger brother of motoring journalist Peter Wherrett. Their father was an abusive and violent alcoholic.

He was educated at Trinity Grammar School in Sydney, before attending the University of Sydney, where he graduated with a Bachelor of Arts in 1961. His contemporaries at the university included Clive James, Germaine Greer, Bruce Beresford, Mungo McCallum, Bob Ellis, John Bell, John Gaden, Laurie Oakes and Les Murray.

He taught English and Ancient History at Trinity Grammar for four years.

Wherrett knew he was gay from the age of 17. Nevertheless, he had a well-publicised relationship with the actress Jacki Weaver in the 1970s.

Career
In 1965 Wherrett went to London and worked with the E15 Acting School in Loughton, Essex.  On return to Australia he became associate director to Robin Lovejoy at the Old Tote Theatre Company.  In 1970 he joined John Bell at the Nimrod Theatre Company.

He was the founding director of the Sydney Theatre Company. He directed 127 professional theatre productions. In 1972, he directed the first performance of The Sweatproof Boy, first play written by Alma De Groen, of whom he directed most of early works. In 1987, he directed his first grand opera for the Victoria State Opera at the State Theatre Melbourne. Turandot, Giacomo Puccini's final opera, was a lavish production starring Corneliu Murgu, Olivia Stapp and Glenys Fowles, with the State Orchestra of Victoria conducted by Richard Divall.

Wherett was the creative director for the lighting of the torch segment of the Opening Ceremony for the 2000 Olympic Games in Sydney.

Publications
With his brother Peter he wrote a memoir, Desirelines.  He also wrote The Floor of Heaven: My Life in Theatre in 2000.

Honours
He was made a Member of the Order of Australia in 1984 for his services to the theatre as a producer and director.

Death and legacy
Wherrett died of liver failure on 7 December 2001, three days before his 61st birthday, after 15 years warding off the effects of HIV.  His funeral service was held at St John's Anglican Church, Darlinghurst, with ushers provided by the Sydney Opera House. The General Manager of the Opera House, Michael Lynch, dimmed the lights on the Opera House sails in what Jacki Weaver called "a movingly fitting tribute".

The Richard Wherrett Fellowship was created in his memory by the STC in his memory. It was awarded to Jessica Arthur in 2017, and to Shari Sebbens in 2020.

References

Citations

1940 births
2001 deaths
AIDS-related deaths in Australia
Australian theatre directors
Gay men
LGBT theatre directors
Australian LGBT writers
Members of the Order of Australia
People educated at Trinity Grammar School (New South Wales)
Australian memoirists
LGBT memoirists
20th-century memoirists
20th-century LGBT people